Yevheniy Andriyovych Nikolashyn (born 2 April 2003) is a Ukrainian professional footballer who plays as a right winger for Ukrainian club Kryvbas Kryvyi Rih.

References

External links
 Profile on Lyubomyr Stavyshche official website
 
 

2003 births
Living people
Sportspeople from Kryvyi Rih
Ukrainian footballers
Association football forwards
FC Hirnyk Kryvyi Rih players
FC Kryvbas Kryvyi Rih players
FC Lyubomyr Stavyshche players
Ukrainian Second League players